Feud is an American docudrama television series created by Ryan Murphy, Jaffe Cohen, and Michael Zam, which premiered on FX on March 5, 2017. Conceived as an anthology series, Feuds first season, Bette and Joan, chronicles (over eight episodes) the well-documented rivalry between Hollywood actresses Joan Crawford and Bette Davis during and after the production of their psychological horror thriller film What Ever Happened to Baby Jane? (1962). Jessica Lange and Susan Sarandon star as Crawford and Davis, respectively. Judy Davis, Jackie Hoffman, Alfred Molina, Stanley Tucci, and Alison Wright feature in supporting roles. Academy Award–winning actresses Catherine Zeta-Jones and Kathy Bates also appear.

Critically acclaimed, with major praise for Lange and Sarandon's performances, the series garnered several accolades. It received 18 nominations at the 69th Primetime Emmy Awards and won two, including Outstanding Hairstyling and Makeup (Non-Prosthetic). Bette and Joan also received six Critics' Choice Awards, four Golden Globe Awards, two Screen Actors Guild Awards, and three Television Critics Association Awards nominations.

In February 2017, FX renewed the series for a 10-episode second season. Following a hiatus during which Murphy exited the series, in April 2022, it was announced that the second season would be Capotes Women, with Jon Robin Baitz serving as showrunner/writer, Gus Van Sant as director, and Naomi Watts starring as Babe Paley. The season will focus on the fallout of a roman à clef story written by author Truman Capote based on the lives of several New York socialites.

Summary
The series (subtitled Bette and Joan in anticipation of future seasons) centers on the backstage battle between Bette Davis (Susan Sarandon) and Joan Crawford (Jessica Lange) during and after the production of their 1962 film What Ever Happened to Baby Jane?.

Cast and characters

Bette and Joan

Main
 Jessica Lange as Joan Crawford/Blanche Hudson
 Susan Sarandon as Bette Davis/Baby Jane Hudson
 Judy Davis as Hedda Hopper, gossip columnist
 Jackie Hoffman as Mamacita, Crawford's housekeeper
 Alfred Molina as Robert Aldrich, director/producer of What Ever Happened to Baby Jane? and Hush...Hush, Sweet Charlotte
 Stanley Tucci as Jack L. Warner, head of Warner Bros.
 Alison Wright as Pauline Jameson, Aldrich's assistant

Recurring
 Catherine Zeta-Jones as Olivia de Havilland, Davis's friend and fellow actress who costars with her in Hush...Hush, Sweet Charlotte and participates in a 1970s documentary on Crawford
 Kathy Bates as Joan Blondell, Davis's friend and fellow actress who participates in a 1970s documentary on Crawford
 Kiernan Shipka as B. D. Merrill, Davis's daughter
 Dominic Burgess as Victor Buono, an actor who costars in What Ever Happened to Baby Jane? and Hush...Hush, Sweet Charlotte
 Reed Diamond as Peter, Joan's latest paramour
 Joel Kelley Dauten as Adam Freedman, a documentary filmmaker
 Molly Price as Harriet Foster Aldrich, Robert Aldrich's wife
 Ken Lerner as Marty, Crawford's agent

Historical figures
Feud features appearances by a number of actors, directors and other historical figures of the period, including:

 Alisha Soper as Marilyn Monroe, winner of the Best Actress Golden Globe in 1960 for Some Like It Hot
 Mark Valley as Gary Merrill, a fading actor and Bette Davis's estranged fourth husband
 Jake Robards as Patrick O'Neal, Bette's costar in the Broadway production of The Night of the Iguana
 Lizz Carter as Margaret Leighton, Bette's costar in the Broadway production of The Night of the Iguana
 Kris Black as Cliff Robertson, Joan's costar in Autumn Leaves
 Jon Morgan Woodward as Alfred Steele, the CEO of the Pepsi-Cola Company and Joan Crawford's fourth husband
 Tom Berklund as Fred MacMurray, Joan's costar in Above Suspicion
 Kerry Stein as Louis B. Mayer, Metro-Goldwyn-Mayer studio head
 Scott Vance as Michael Curtiz, director of Mildred Pierce who gave Crawford her Best Actress Oscar in 1945
 Toby Huss as Frank Sinatra, singer and actor who stars in Aldrich's film 4 for Texas
 Cameron Cowperthwaite as Michael Parks, Bette's costar in an episode of Perry Mason
 Daniel Hagen as Michael Luciano, film editor of What Ever Happened to Baby Jane?
 Taylor Coffman as Lee Remick, Davis's co-nominee for Best Actress in 1963
 Sarah Paulson as Geraldine Page, Davis' co-nominee for Best Actress in 1963
 Cash Black as Rip Torn, Geraldine Page's husband
 Raymond J. Barry as Hal LeSueur, Joan Crawford's brother
 Serinda Swan as Anne Bancroft, winner of the Best Actress Oscar in 1963 for The Miracle Worker
 Paris Verra as Patty Duke, winner of the Best Supporting Actress Oscar in 1963, who appeared with Bancroft in The Miracle Worker
 Phillip Boyd as Maximilian Schell, winner of the Best Actor Oscar in 1962 for Judgment at Nuremberg
 Anthony Crivello as David Lean, winner of the Best Director Oscar in 1963 for Lawrence of Arabia
 Bryant Boon as Gregory Peck, winner of the Best Actor Oscar in 1963 for To Kill a Mockingbird
 Louis B. Jack as Ed Begley, winner of the Best Supporting Actor Oscar in 1963 for Sweet Bird of Youth
 Anthony Tyler Quinn as Wendell Corey, president of the Academy of Motion Picture Arts and Sciences from 1961 to 1963
 Eric Callero as Jack Lord, actor who attended the 35th Academy Awards
 Lindsay Hanzl as Eva Marie Saint, actress who attended the 35th Academy Awards
 Greg Winter as Robert Stack, actor who attended the 35th Academy Awards
 John Rubinstein as George Cukor, a film director and longtime friend of Crawford
 John Waters as William Castle, the director and producer of Crawford's 1964 horror B movie Strait-Jacket
 Earlene Davis as Agnes Moorehead, an actress who costars in Hush… Hush, Sweet Charlotte
 Matthew Glave as Joseph Cotten, an actor who costars in Hush… Hush, Sweet Charlotte
 James Hawthorn as Bruce Dern, actor who appears in Hush… Hush, Sweet Charlotte
 Melissa Russell as Diane Baker, Joan's costar in Strait-Jacket

Capote's Women
 Naomi Watts as Babe Paley
 Chloë Sevigny as C. Z. Guest
 Tom Hollander as Truman Capote
 Calista Flockhart as Lee Radziwill
 Diane Lane as Slim Keith
 Demi Moore as Ann Woodward
 Molly Ringwald as Joanne Carson
 Treat Williams as Bill Paley
 Joe Mantello as Jack Dunphy

Episodes

Season 1: Bette and Joan (2017)

Production

Development
Ryan Murphy, a fan of Davis since his childhood, interviewed the actress just months before her death in 1989. The agreed-upon 20-minute interview lasted four hours, and inspired his characterization of Davis in Feud. He said, "When I would ask her about Joan Crawford ... She would just go on about how much she hated her. But then she would sort of say ... 'She was a professional. And I admired that'." Murphy first conceived Bette and Joan as a film years before the FX series, and approached both Sarandon and Lange about the lead roles. Sarandon said, "It just felt like it didn't have a context, just being bitchy and kind of funny, but what else? In expanding it to eight hours, you could get more complexity and so many other characters."

Feud: Bette and Joan was being written at the same time that Murphy was forming his Half Foundation, which promotes an increased presence of women in film and television production positions. The series features 15 acting roles for women over 40, and half the episodes were directed by women, including actress Helen Hunt. Initially conceived as an anthology series, Feud, developed by Murphy, was picked up to series by FX on May 5, 2016. Bette and Joan was inspired by the real-life feud between Crawford and Davis, and explores issues of sexism, ageism, and misogyny in Hollywood. Its eight episodes were expanded from a feature-length screenplay Murphy had optioned called Best Actress by Jaffe Cohen and Michael Zam.

Sarandon said, "In our story, it was a fact that [the people behind Baby Jane] encouraged the animosity [between Crawford and Davis], first of all to control them, second of all to make what they thought was more onscreen tension, and that really hasn't changed a lot." Melanie McFarland of Salon wrote that the series shows "just how brutal the Hollywood system was on some of the greatest talents in its firmament" and that it "cuts to the root of why collaborating and delighting in the fall of the mighty is eternally marketable." The Crawford-Davis feud was also documented in Shaun Considine's 1989 book Bette and Joan: The Divine Feud.

Casting

Frequent Murphy collaborator Jessica Lange and Susan Sarandon were attached to star as Joan Crawford and Bette Davis in Feud. Alfred Molina, Stanley Tucci, Judy Davis, and Dominic Burgess were also a part of the cast, in the roles of Robert Aldrich, Jack L. Warner, Hedda Hopper, and Victor Buono, respectively. In August 2016, Catherine Zeta-Jones and Sarah Paulson joined the cast playing Olivia de Havilland and Geraldine Page, respectively.

In September 2016, it was reported that American Horror Story executive producer Tim Minear would be co-showrunning the series with Murphy. Jackie Hoffman joined the cast as Mamacita, Crawford's housekeeper. In November 2016, Molly Price, Kathy Bates and Alison Wright joined the cast of the series, in the roles of Harriet Foster, Joan Blondell, and Pauline Jameson. In January 2017, it was announced Kiernan Shipka was cast in the series as Davis's daughter, Barbara "B.D." Sherry.

Sarandon admitted to initially being "overwhelmed and terrified" about the prospect of portraying Davis accurately. She said, "She's so big and she really was so big, so I tried not to make her a caricature or someone a female impersonator would do ... That was my fear, that she would just be kind of one-dimensional." Lange said her performance was informed by her view that Crawford's "brutal childhood" was masked by the "beautiful, impenetrable veneer of this great, gorgeous movie star ... So she was always on, which is a tremendous burden in and of itself, but always there was this thing lurking underneath of being this poverty-stricken, abused, unloved, abandoned young child and woman." Both Sarandon and Lange researched their roles by reading books by and about Davis and Crawford, and watching and listening to TV performances and recordings.

For Capote's Women, Naomi Watts was cast to star as Babe Paley in April 2022. In August, Chloë Sevigny, Tom Hollander, Calista Flockhart and Diane Lane would be added to the cast. The following month, Demi Moore and Molly Ringwald were added to the cast.

Future
FX renewed the series for a 10-episode second season on February 28, 2017, with Murphy and Jon Robin Baitz attached as writers. Initially planned with a focus on the relationship between Charles, Prince of Wales and Diana, Princess of Wales, the season was first titled Charles and Diana, then renamed Buckingham Palace, with Matthew Goode and Rosamund Pike cast in the titular roles. Plans for Buckingham Palace were eventually scrapped in August 2018. In November 2019, Murphy stated he was open to resume work on Feud.

An April 2022 announcement unveiled new plans for the second season, with Jon Robin Baitz serving as showrunner/writer and Gus Van Sant as director: Capotes Women will focus on the fallout of a roman à clef by author Truman Capote based on the lives of several New York socialites.

Release

Marketing
Murphy gave several interviews about Feud during the 2017 Winter TCA Press Tour. The show's first teaser trailer was released on January 19, 2017, and the second the following day. That same week, Lange and Sarandon appeared on the cover of Entertainment Weekly as Crawford and Davis. FX released another teaser on January 23, two on February 5, one on February 7, and one on February 8. A short commercial for the show also aired during Super Bowl LI.

Premiere
Feud had its official premiere at the Chinese Theatre in Los Angeles on March 1, 2017. Before the show's premiere, FX held screenings of the pilot episode at several gay bars across the United States.

Broadcast
The first season of eight episodes, Bette and Joan, premiered in the United States on March 5, 2017 on FX and on BBC Two in the United Kingdom on December 16, 2017.

Soundtrack
The original television soundtrack of Feud: Bette and Joan, with music by Mac Quayle, was released in two editions: a regular edition with 23 tracks, and a limited edition with 31 tracks.

Reception

Critical response
Feud received highly positive reviews, with major praise for Lange and Sarandon's performances. On review aggregator Rotten Tomatoes, the series has an approval rating of 91% based on 84 reviews, with an average rating of 8.1/10. The site's critical consensus reads, "While campily and sweetly indulgent, Feud: Bette and Joan provides poignant understanding of humanity, sorrow, and pain while breezily feeding inquisitive gossip-starved minds." On Metacritic, the series has a score of 81 out of 100, based on 44 critics, indicating "universal acclaim".

Melanie McFarland of Salon called the writing "creatively wicked" and the series "outrageously fantastic", praising Lange and Sarandon for their performances and for "tempering their decadent rages and vengeful spats with a gutting sense of loneliness that tempers its lightness in solemnity." Verne Gay of Newsday wrote that the series is "Full of joy, humor, brilliant writing and performances, and a deep unabiding love for what really makes Hollywood great—the women." People called the series "bitter, biting and entertaining". The Atlantic Spencer Kornhaber described the first few episodes as "deft and satisfying" but suggested that "maybe six installments, rather than eight, were all this tale needed". Alan Sepinwall of Uproxx wrote that the series is "big and it's catty, but it's also smart and elegant, with the old Hollywood setting toning down some of Murphy's more scattershot creative impulses."  Emily Nussbaum, in The New Yorker, praised Murphy's ambition and lauded both stars, saying of the series, "Beneath the zingers and the poolside muumuus, the show's stark theme is how skillfully patriarchy screws with women's heads—mostly by building a home in there."

Not all reviews were positive. Sonia Saraiya of Variety  compared Bette and Joan unfavorably to Murphy's The People v. O. J. Simpson: American Crime Story, writing that Feud is "neither as brilliantly campy and hateful as What Ever Happened to Baby Jane? nor as contextualizing and profound as People v. O. J. Simpson." David Weigand of the San Francisco Chronicle gave the series a mixed review, criticizing the script and Lange's performance, but praising Sarandon's, writing: "Lange is always interesting, but she’s only occasionally convincing here as Crawford. The voice is too high, for one thing. Sarandon fares better, as much good as that does with such a lousy script."  The Guardian also criticized the series for being "lightweight", noting, "At just eight episodes, there’s almost too much to cover and at times, one craves a little more depth to certain moments." They singled out Lange's performance, however, writing, "Lange in particular moves past just an easy impression to something with far more weight. In a reversal of fortune that would make Crawford cackle in her grave, it’s likely that she’ll be the one up for awards at the end of the year rather than her co-star."

Controversy
On June 30, 2017, a day before her 101st birthday, actress Olivia de Havilland filed a lawsuit against Feud: Bette and Joan for inaccurately portraying her and using her likeness without permission. The lawsuit stated that the pseudo-documentary-style of the series leads viewers to believe that the statements made by the actress portraying de Havilland in the show are accurate, but that in fact de Havilland had not said such things in real life.  The various defendants filed a motion to dismiss under California's "anti-SLAPP" law. The trial court denied the motion but, on March 26, 2018, the California Court of Appeal, Second District, reversed the decision and ordered the lawsuit dismissed on the grounds that no person can "own history". The Court of Appeal further ruled the defendants were entitled to be reimbursed their attorneys' fees. De Havilland filed for estoppels to pursue action with higher courts, securing a restraining order against Murphy and the production company from airing Feud until further review and a court date with the United States Supreme Court. In January 2019, the Supreme Court declined to hear the case.

Ratings
The first episode drew 2.26 million live-plus-same-day viewers, which Deadline.com characterized as "solid" and made it the most watched program on FX that week. In comparison, the premiere of The People v. O. J. Simpson attracted 5.1 million viewers in 2016, and the FX limited series Fargo got 2.66 million in 2014. The premiere earned 3.8 million viewers in the Nielsen live-plus-three-days ratings, and 5.17 million viewers total when including two encore broadcasts, making it the highest rated new series debut on FX since The People v. O. J. Simpson.

Accolades

References

External links
 
 

2010s American anthology television series
2010s American drama television series
2017 American television series debuts
American biographical series
American television docudramas
Bette Davis
English-language television shows
FX Networks original programming
Joan Crawford
Television controversies in the United States
Television series about show business
Television series by 20th Century Fox Television
Television series created by Ryan Murphy (writer)